"Cry Myself to Sleep" is a song written by Paul Kennerley, and recorded by American country music duo The Judds.  It was released in September 1986 as the fourth single from the album Rockin' with the Rhythm.  The song was their eighth number one country hit.  The single went to number one for one week and spent a total of sixteen weeks on the country chart.

The song was also recorded by Steve Earle and released in 1984 as the B-side to the "What'll You Do About Me" single. It also appears on his Early Tracks album.

Charts

Weekly charts

Year-end charts

References

1986 singles
Steve Earle songs
The Judds songs
Songs written by Paul Kennerley
RCA Records singles
Curb Records singles
Song recordings produced by Brent Maher
1984 songs
Songs about sleep